Searstown is the name of several shopping centers, derived from the name of the department store chain Sears. It may refer to:

 The Mall at Whitney Field, formerly Searstown Mall, in Leominster, Massachusetts
 Searstown Mall, a defunct shopping mall in Titusville, Florida
 Searstown Shopping Center, a strip mall in Fort Lauderdale, Florida
 Searstown Plaza, a strip mall in Key West, Florida